Geoffrey Doumayrou (born 16 September 1989) is a French rugby union player. His position is in the Centre and he currently plays for Stade Rochelais in the Top 14.

Doumayrou began his career at Montpellier Hérault in his hometown. He made his debut in January 2009 against Clermont Auvergne in the Top 14. He went on to make 59 appearances over the following four seasons scoring a total of 8 tries in the process.

Doumayrou joined Stade Français ahead of the 2012-13 Top 14 season. He made over 100 appearances for the club scoring 25 tries in a five year period that saw them win the 2014–15 Top 14 and the European Challenge Cup in the 2016–17 season.

Doumayrou joined Stade Rochelais ahead of the 2017–18 Top 14 season.

References

External links
France profile at FFR

1989 births
Living people
French rugby union players
Sportspeople from Montpellier
Montpellier Hérault Rugby players
Stade Français players
Stade Rochelais players
Rugby union centres
France international rugby union players